Oona Castilla Chaplin (born 4 June 1986) is a Spanish–Swiss actress. Her roles include Talisa Maegyr in the HBO TV series Game of Thrones, Kitty Trevelyan in the BBC drama The Crimson Field, and Zilpha Geary in the series Taboo.

A member of the Chaplin family, she is the daughter of actress Geraldine Chaplin, granddaughter of English filmmaker and actor Charlie Chaplin, and great-granddaughter of Irish-American playwright Eugene O'Neill. She was named after her maternal grandmother Oona O'Neill, Charlie Chaplin’s fourth and final wife.

Early life
Chaplin was born in Madrid to English-American actress Geraldine Chaplin and Chilean cinematographer Patricio Castilla. She has a half-brother named Shane from her mother's previous relationship with film director Carlos Saura. 

Chaplin spent her childhood mostly in Spain, the United Kingdom, Switzerland and Cuba, but travelled often because of her mother's film career. She started dancing ballet, salsa and flamenco at an early age.

When Chaplin was 15, she began studying at Gordonstoun School in Scotland on a drama scholarship. She appeared in several school plays;  toured the United Kingdom in an adaptation of Romeo and Juliet; and impersonated her grandfather in the role of Bottom in an adaptation of A Midsummer Night's Dream at the Edinburgh Festival Fringe. After leaving Gordonstoun, she was accepted into the Royal Academy of Dramatic Art in London, where she graduated in 2007.

Career
Since graduating from RADA, Chaplin has acted in mainly British and Spanish short and feature films. She has played alongside her mother in the feature films Inconceivable, ¿Para qué sirve un oso?, Imago Mortis and Anchor and Hope. She has also had supporting roles in British and American television. She appeared as a Brazilian cage dancer in ITV's Married Single Other (2010); as Marnie Madden, the wife of main character Hector Madden, in the BBC period drama The Hour (2011–2012); as John Watson's girlfriend in an episode of BBC's Sherlock (2012); and as Talisa Maegyr in HBO's Game of Thrones (2012–2013).

She plays Kitty Trevelyan, a lead character, in the BBC drama The Crimson Field (2014), and Ira Levinson's wife Ruth Levinson in The Longest Ride (2015).

She stars as Zilpha Geary in the eight-part historical fiction series Taboo (2017) on BBC One and FX.

Chaplin joined the cast of James Cameron's Avatar sequels in June 2017. Her character, Varang, is described as "a strong and vibrant central character who spans the entire saga of the sequels".

Filmography

Film

Television

References

External links

Oona Chaplin at the Royal Academy of Dramatic Arts

1986 births
Living people
Actresses from Madrid
Spanish people of English descent
Spanish people of Chilean descent
Spanish people of American descent
Spanish people of Irish descent
Spanish people of Mapuche descent
Spanish people of Romanian descent
Spanish television actresses
Spanish film actresses
Oona
21st-century Spanish actresses
People educated at Gordonstoun
Alumni of RADA
Ballet dancers
Salsa dancers
Flamenco dancers